The 2019 Major League Soccer All-Star Game was the 24th edition of the annual Major League Soccer All-Star Game. It was held on July 31 at Exploria Stadium in Orlando, Florida against Spanish club Atlético Madrid. Atlético won the game 3–0.

The game was televised domestically on FS1 and UniMás in the US, on TSN and TVA Sports in Canada and in more than 170 other countries around the world.

Pre-match

In September 2018, MLS announced that Orlando would host the All-Star Game "in recognition of Orlando City Soccer Club’s emergence as a preeminent organization, Orlando City Stadium’s stature as one of North America’s elite soccer venues, and the overwhelming support of soccer fans in the community." Atlético Madrid was confirmed as the match's opponents in May 2019. Atlético was the 13th different European side to feature in the event and the second from La Liga following city rivals Real Madrid's 2017 match-up in Chicago.

MLS All-Star Week was a five-day program of entertainment and fan experiences. On June 13, it was announced multi-platinum Latin pop singer Prince Royce would headline the 2019 edition of the MLS All-Star Concert which also featured A-Trak. The concert was free to attend for the public and was held on July 27 at Wall Street Plaza. On July 28, there was an eMLS All-Star Challenge where professional eMLS gamers paired up with the likes Landon Donovan and Diego Forlán to play FIFA. The tournament was won by Orlando City's FIFA Abe and guest player AnthFifa who won a 64-player amateur competition earlier in the day.

As is tradition, Orlando also hosted the Homegrown Game that runs parallel to the All-Star Game. The game saw a selection of the best young Homegrown Players in MLS play Mexican youth team Chivas U-20s. The Homegrowns won the match on penalties after the game finished in a 2–2 draw.

Following the Homegrown game, MLS debuted a new skills challenge event, pitting three teams composed of All-Stars (Wayne Rooney, Jonathan dos Santos and Carlos Vela), Atlético Madrid players (Koke, Héctor Herrera and João Félix) as well as players from host side Orlando City (Nani, Sebas Méndez and Chris Mueller) against each other in a series of games created by F2Freestylers to test creativity, control and accuracy. Both events were held on July 30 at ESPN Wide World of Sports Complex, the same venue as the NFL's similarly-themed Skills Showdown during the Pro Bowl. Orlando City won after Nani hit the crossbar with the last kick of the competition, winning $25,000 for the Orlando City Foundation.

Match rules
Unlimited substitutions
Penalty shoot-out if tied through full-time; no extra time

Squads

MLS All-Stars

 Manager:  James O'Connor (Orlando City)

Atlético Madrid

 Manager:  Diego Simeone

Match

References 

2019
All-Star Game
MLS All-Star
Atlético Madrid matches
2010s in Orlando, Florida
July 2019 sports events in the United States